The 2015 Turkmenistan Higher League (Ýokary Liga) season is the 23rd season of Turkmenistan's professional football league. It began on 5 March 2015 with the first round of games and will end in November 2015.

Teams

League table

Results

Games 1–18

Games 19–36

Top scorers

Hat-tricks

 4 Player scored 4 goals

See also
2015 Turkmenistan Cup
2015 Turkmenistan First League

References

External links
 Season at soccerway.com
 Official news agency site 

Ýokary Liga seasons
Turk
Turk
1